Edward Stanhope (c. 1547 – 1608) was the member of the Parliament of England for Marlborough for the parliaments of 1584 and 1586.

References 

Members of Parliament for Marlborough
1540s births
1608 deaths
Year of birth uncertain
English MPs 1584–1585
English MPs 1586–1587